Clarence Valley Council is a local government area in the Northern Rivers region of New South Wales, Australia.

The area under management is adjacent to the Pacific Highway, the Gwydir Highway and the North Coast railway line. The Clarence Valley region includes the coastal plain and lower valleys of the Clarence and Nymboida river. Most of the valley is agricultural; however, the oceanside towns of Yamba and Iluka are popular holiday resorts.

The council was formed in February 2004 by the amalgamation of the City of Grafton and Maclean Shire, and parts of Copmanhurst, Pristine Waters and Richmond Valley local government areas, and the activities of North Coast Water and Clarence River County Council.
 
The Mayor of Clarence Valley Council is Ian Tiley, an independent politician.

Towns and localities 

Towns and localities in the Clarence Valley Council are:

 Grafton
 South Grafton
 Alumy Creek
 Angourie
 Banyabba
 Baryulgil
 Billys Creek
 Brooms Head
 Calliope
 Carrs Creek
 Carrs Island
 Chatsworth
 Clouds Creek
 Coaldale
 Coldstream
 Copmanhurst
 Coutts Crossing
 Cowper
 Dalmorton
 Diggers Camp
 Dundurrabin
 Eatonsville
 Gilletts Ridge
 Glenreagh
 Glenugie
 Great Marlow
 Gulmarrad
 Gurranang
 Harwood
 Iluka
 Junction Hill
 Koolkhan
 Kungala
 Lanitza
 Lawrence
 Maclean
 Minnie Water
 Mororo
 Mountain View
Newton Boyd (South-eastern part)
 Nymboida
 Palmers Channel
 Palmers Island
 Punchbowl
 Rushforth
 Sandon
 Seelands
 Shark Creek
 South Arm
 Southampton
 Southgate
 Stockyard Creek
 Swan Creek
 Townsend
 Trenayr
 Tucabia
 Tullymorgan
 Tyndale
 Tyringham
 Ulmarra
 Waterview
 Waterview Heights
 Wooloweyah
 Wooli
 Woombah
 Yamba

Heritage listings
The Clarence Valley Council has a number of heritage-listed sites, including:
 High Conservation Value Old Growth forest

Demographics
Aboriginal and Torres Strait Islander people made up 5.7 per cent of the population which is more than double the national and state averages of 2.5 per cent. The median age of people in the Clarence Valley Council area was 46 years; some 10 years higher than the national median. Children aged 0 – 14 years made up 18.6 per cent of the population and people aged 65 years and over made up 21.3 per cent of the population. Of people in the area aged 15 years and over, 49.3 per cen% were married and 14.6% were either divorced or separated.

When compared with total population growth of Australia for the same period, being 8.32 per cent, population growth in the Clarence Valley local government area was lower than the national average. The median weekly income for residents within the Clarence Valley Council area was significantly below the national average, being one of the factors that place the Clarence Valley Council area in an area of social disadvantage.

At the 2011 Census, the proportion of residents in the Clarence Valley local government area who stated their ancestry as Australian or Anglo-Celtic exceeded 82 per cent of all residents (national average was 65.2 per cent). In excess of 64 per cent of all residents in the Clarence Valley Council area nominated a religious affiliation with Christianity at the 2011 Census, which was above the national average of 50.2 per cent. Meanwhile, as at the Census date, compared to the national average, households in the Clarence Valley local government area had a significantly lower than average proportion (3.1 per cent) where two or more languages are spoken (national average was 20.4 per cent); and a significantly higher proportion (94.0 per cent) where English only was spoken at home (national average was 76.8 per cent).

Council

Current composition and election method
Clarence Valley Council is composed of nine Councillors elected proportionally as one entire ward. All Councillors are elected for a fixed four-year term of office. The Mayor is elected by the Councillors at the first meeting of the Council. The most recent election was held on 4 December 2021, and the makeup of the Council is as follows:

The current Council, elected in 2021, in order of election, is:

References

External links
Clarence Valley Council Website
Clarence Valley Tourism Website

 
Local government areas of New South Wales
Grafton, New South Wales
2004 establishments in Australia